Rose Long (née McConnell; April 8, 1892May 27, 1970) was an American politician who served as a Senator, and the wife of Huey Long. She was the third woman to ever serve as a U.S. Senator, and the first from Louisiana.

Life and work

Rose McConnell was born in Greensburg, Indiana. She met Huey Long after she won a cake baking contest that he had organized to promote a product he was selling at the time. After a two-and-a-half year courtship, Rose and Huey were married in 1913. The next year he turned to the study of law, and became a lawyer after passing the bar. They had three children together. Huey Long became a highly successful politician, elected as governor of Louisiana in 1928 and then US Senator from Louisiana in 1930.

After Huey's assassination in 1935, in an example of widow's succession, Rose was appointed to serve in his seat in the United States Senate until a special election could be held. She won the special election on April 21, 1936, to serve the remaining months of her husband's term, but was not a candidate that fall for re-election to a full six-year term. Because Hattie Caraway (D-Arkansas) was already serving in the Senate when Rose Long was elected, it marked the first time that two women had ever served simultaneously in that body.

Rose Long died in Boulder, Colorado, in 1970, where she lived near her daughter, Rose Lolita Long McFarland.  She was also survived by her sons, Palmer Reid Long of Shreveport, Louisiana, and Russell B. Long, then the sitting United States Senator from Louisiana.

Legacy
Mrs. Long was portrayed by Ann Dowd in the 1995 television movie Kingfish: A Story of Huey Long.

On February 1, 2014, Mrs. Long was posthumously inducted into the Louisiana Political Museum and Hall of Fame in Winnfield. Six others were honored as well, including John S. Hunt II, son of her sister-in-law Lucille Long Hunt, and who had served on the Public Service Commission from 1964 to 1972. Robert "Bob" Mann, press secretary to Senator Russell B. Long, was also inducted.

See also
Women in the United States Senate

References

External links

 Rose McConnell Long (1892–1970) Find A Grave Memorial

|-

1892 births
1970 deaths
Burials in Louisiana
Democratic Party United States senators from Louisiana
First Ladies and Gentlemen of Louisiana
Rose
Louisiana Democrats
Female United States senators
Politicians from Boulder, Colorado
People from Greensburg, Indiana
Politicians from Baton Rouge, Louisiana
Women in Louisiana politics